Zinaida Belovetskaya (born 10 November 1939) is a Russian former butterfly swimmer. She competed in two events at the 1960 Summer Olympics for the Soviet Union.

References

External links
 

1939 births
Living people
Russian female butterfly swimmers
Olympic swimmers of the Soviet Union
Swimmers at the 1960 Summer Olympics
People from Severodvinsk
Soviet female butterfly swimmers
Sportspeople from Arkhangelsk Oblast